Mitchell High School is located in Mitchell, Nebraska, United States. In the 2005–06 school year, the school had a population of about 305 students in grades 7–12. Mitchell High School is a member of the Nebraska School Activities Association. The socioeconomic status of the students is low-middle to middle income. The principal is Heath Peters.

The school mascot is the Tiger.

School activities include football, volleyball, golf, cross-country, basketball, wrestling, one-acts, speech, marching band, jazz choir, FBLA, Quiz Bowl, National Honor Society, track and field, and cheer-leading.

External links
 Mitchell Jr./Sr. High School
 Mitchell City Schools

Public high schools in Nebraska
Schools in Scotts Bluff County, Nebraska
Public middle schools in Nebraska